Jessica Rogers (born 9 March 1997) is an American wheelchair basketballer, wheelchair racer and swimmer. She is also the founder of the International Sacral Agenesis/Caudal Regression Syndrome Association, or iSACRA, an organization for information sharing, support, and networking.

Early life
Rogers was born in Brazil where she spent the first part of her life in an isolated crib in a care facility for adults with severe cognitive limitations. At 14 months old she was adopted into a single parent household with many siblings who have different special needs. Jessica was born with the rare condition of lumbosacral agenesis/caudal regression syndrome and has had bilateral leg amputations due to the condition. Her spine ends at approximately T 7–10, which caused some paralysis. Jessica was born with one kidney and a very small lower anatomy, a common trait associated with caudal regression syndrome.

She graduated from Wilbert Tucker Woodson High School in 2015; she founded The International Sacral Agenesis/Caudal Regression Association, or iSACRA, with a group of volunteers in 2012.

Awards and achievements 

2015: Ranked One of the Top Female U.S. Paralympics Track and Field High School All-Americans – 100 M (Ranked 4th, time: 19.08); 200 M (Ranked 6th, time: 34.88); 400 M (Ranked 7th, time 69.06); 800 M (Ranked 5th, time: 02:23.94)
 2014: U.S. Paralympics, a division of USOC (United States Olympic Committee) Track and field high school all American female 
 2014: 10th International Wheelchair Amputee Sports (IWAS) World Junior Games, Stoke Mandeville, medalist 100, 200, 400, 800 M track events
 2013: U.S. Paralympics, a division USOC (United States Olympic Committee) Track and field high school all American female, 100 M with a time of 20:34
 2013: IWAS World Junior Games Mayaguez, Puerto Rico – Special Performance Award (recognition of athletes with international potential competing in their first IWAS World Junior Games) 
 2013: IWAS World Junior Games Mayaguez, Puerto Rico – Swimming S5 category, Gold medal (50m backstroke); Silver medal (200 Individual Medley); Athletics, Two Gold medals (200m; Super Sprint T1, time 1.01.47) 
 2013: International Wheelchair Amputee Sports Junior World Games selectee for US Junior Team, paratriathalon, swimming and track
 2013: National Wave triathlete, US National Paratriathalon Championships, Austin, Texas
 2013: National Junior Disability Championships, Rochester, Minnesota, First place 100, 200, 400, 800, 1500 meter wheelchair track, first place 50 m back, breast, fly, free, 100 m breast, 100 m free swimming
 2013: National Junior Disability Championships, Rochester, Minnesota, Female Track Athlete Spirit of Excellence Award 
 2011: Parapan American Games, Guadalajara, Mexico, silver medal 100 m breaststroke
 2011: SPORTS 'N SPOKES Magazine's Junior Athlete of the Year
 2011: Founded iSACRA, an international organization for information and support of individuals with sacral agenesis/caudal regression syndrome
 2010: Junior National Champion, 100, 200, 400, 800 m wheelchair track
 2010: Im Able Foundation's Racing Wheelchair Recipient
 2010: American Paralympic record holder, women's 100 SCY breaststroke
 2010: American Paralympic record holder, women's 200 SCY IM
 2010: Canadian American Paralympic National Champion women's 100 m breaststroke
 2009: Canadian American Paralympic National Champion women's 100 m breaststroke
 2009: Canadian American Paralympic National Champion women's 200 m breaststroke
 2008: National Junior Disability Championships, First place 100, 200, 400 m wheelchair track

Filmography
Documentaries and other television appearances include:

See also
Caudal regression syndrome

References

External links
International Sacral Agenesis/Caudal Regression Association – an organization founded by Jessica Rogers
US Paralympic Biography
A Child's Courage – The REBUILT: The Human Body Shop segment featuring Jessica Rogers
http://pvamag.com/sns/article/3739/2011_junior_athlete_of_the_year

Living people
1997 births
American adoptees
American female breaststroke swimmers
American amputees
American women's wheelchair basketball players
American disabled sportspeople
American female wheelchair racers
People from São Carlos
Brazilian emigrants to the United States
People with caudal regression syndrome
Wilbert Tucker Woodson High School alumni
Paralympic swimmers of the United States
Paralympic track and field athletes of the United States
Medalists at the 2011 Parapan American Games
21st-century American women
20th-century American women